is a Japanese professional golfer.

Takayama was born in Wakayama. He took up golf at eighteen, an unusually advanced age for a future professional, and turned pro three years later. He made his mark by winning the 2001 PGA Rookie Pro Tournament and has since won five times on the Japan Golf Tour.

Professional wins (7)

Japan Golf Tour wins (5)

*Note: The 2005 Token Homemate Cup was shortened to 54 holes due to weather.
1Co-sanctioned by the Asian Tour

Japan Golf Tour playoff record (2–1)

Other wins (2)
2001 PGA Rookie Pro Tournament (Japan)
2002 Sankei Sports Kinki Open (Japan)

Results in major championships

CUT = missed the half-way cut
"T" indicates a tie for a place

Results in World Golf Championships

"T" = Tied

External links

Japanese male golfers
Japan Golf Tour golfers
Sportspeople from Wakayama Prefecture
1978 births
Living people